The Kentucky Wildcats women's basketball team represents the University of Kentucky in the Southeastern Conference. The Wildcats have four Elite Eight appearances and seventeen appearances  in the NCAA Division I women's basketball tournament. They have won the SEC tournament twice and SEC regular season championship once.

The first University of Kentucky women's basketball team was organized in 1902, and competed for the first time on Feb. 21, 1903. However, in 1924, despite a perfect 10-0 season, the University Senate passed a bill to abolish women's basketball in part because, according to state politicians, "basketball had proven to be a strenuous sport for boys and therefore was too strenuous for girls." 

After 50 years, women's basketball was granted varsity status in 1974, and most of the official records maintained by the university only reflect games since that time. The team, coached by Sue Feamster, was given the nickname "Lady Kats", which continued to be used until May 1995.

The team is currently coached by Kyra Elzy.

Facilities
Since the restoration of the program in 1974, the Kentucky Wildcats have played their home games in the 8,500 seat Memorial Coliseum, and their record attendance in that building is 10,622, set on February 5, 1983 against Old Dominion; they also led the nation with an average attendance of 3,645 that season. In recent years, the team has also played occasional games in Rupp Arena, which had a capacity of 23,500 before a renovation completed in 2019 reduced the capacity to 20,545.

In January 2007, the university opened the Joe Craft Center, a $30 million state-of-the-art basketball practice facility for both the men's and women's teams, named after businessman and philanthropist Joe Craft.

In July 2022, Athletic Director  Mitch Barnhart announced that Memorial Coliseum would be receiving extensive upgrades next year. Most notably, Air Conditioning would be added to the building for the first time, as well as seating upgrades, and the addition of new event space. The renovations are expected to last for one competitive year, displacing all 4 teams who call the arena home.

History

Led by UK all-time leading scorer Valerie Still, Patty Jo Hedges, and Lea Wise, the Lady Kats won the SEC Tournament in 1982. The following year, the same trio led the team to a #4 ranking in the country, the highest in the team's history.

Head coaches

 Jane Todd Watson (1903)
 C.P. St. John (1904 - ?)
 Thomson Bryant (? - 1907)
 C.W. Leaphart (1907–1908)
 Walter C. Fox (1908 - ?)
 John J. Tigert (? - 1915, 1916–1917)
 William Tuttle (1915–1916)
 Jim Park (1917–1918)
 Andy Gill (1918–1919)
 Sarah Blanding (1919–1922)
 Happy Chandler (1922–1923)
 Bart Peak (1923–1924)
 Sue Feamster (1974–76)
 Debbie Yow (1976–80)
 Terry Hall (1980–87)
 Sharon Fanning (1987–95)
 Bernadette Locke-Mattox (1995–2003)
 Mickie DeMoss (2003–2007)
 Matthew Mitchell (2007–2020)
Kyra Elzy (2020–present)

Year by year results

Year   Record   Coach

1903 1-0    Jane Todd Walton

1904 2-0   C.P. St. John

1905 Unknown

1906 0-1 Thomson Bryant

1907 No Games Thomson Bryant

1908 3-0-1 C.W. Leaphart

1908–09 4-1 Walter C. Fox

1909–10 7-1 No Coach Listed

1910–11 No Record

1911–12 4-1 J.J. Tigert

1912–13 5-0 J.J. Tigert (State Champions)

1913–14 4-2 J.J. Tigert

1914–15 5-1 J.J. Tigert

1915–16 2-2 William Tuttle

1916–17 5-0 J.J. Tigert

1917–18 1-4 Jim Park

1918–19 2-0 Andy Gill

1919–20 0-3-1 Sarah Blanding

1920–21 1-7 Sarah Blanding

1921–22 2-4 Sarah Blanding

1922–23 7-3 A.B. "Happy" Chandler

1923–24 10-0 Bart Peak (Champions of the South)

Total: 65-30-1

Conference tournament winners noted with W Source

NCAA tournament results

Accomplishments

2009–10
 SEC Player of the Year (consensus): Victoria Dunlap
 SEC Freshman of the Year: A'dia Mathies
 SEC Coach of the Year: Matthew Mitchell

2010–11
 SEC Player of the Year (AP): Victoria Dunlap
 SEC Defensive Player of the Year: Victoria Dunlap

2011–12
 SEC Player of the Year (consensus): A'dia Mathies
 SEC Freshman of the Year (consensus): Bria Goss
 SEC Sixth Woman of the Year (shared; awarded only by coaches): Keyla Snowden
 SEC Coach of the Year (AP): Matthew Mitchell

2012–13
 A'dia Mathies Drafted in the First Round of the 2013 WNBA draft
 SEC Co-Player of the Year : A'dia Mathies

2018–19 
 USBWA National Freshman of the Year: Rhyne Howard

2019–20 
 SEC Player of the Year (consensus): Rhyne Howard

All-American players
 Valerie Still, 1983 (Coaches; Street & Smith)
 Victoria Dunlap, 2010 (AP; USBWA; Coaches')
 A'dia Mathies, 2012 (USBWA), 2013 (AP; Full Court)
 Rhyne Howard, 2020 (AP, USBWA)

Player awards

SEC Awards
Player of the Year
Victoria Dunlap - 2010, 2011
A'dia Mathies - 2012, 2013
Rhyne Howard – 2020 , 2021

See also
 2018–19 Kentucky Wildcats women’s basketball team

References

External links
 

 
Women's sports in Kentucky
1902 establishments in Kentucky
1924 disestablishments in Kentucky
1974 establishments in Kentucky